The Puerto Rico national under-17 football team represents Puerto Rico in tournaments at the under-17 level. It is controlled by the Puerto Rican Football Federation.

History
Puerto Rico made its debut at the 1983 CONCACAF Championship were they faced Honduras and México. Subsequently they played in the FIFA U-17 World Cup qualifiers in 1991, 2000 and 2002. It wasn't until 2006 where they got their first two victories against Anguilla and Saint Lucia.

Since 2012 they have participated in every World Cup qualification. In 2012 the team was managed by Jeaustin Campos where they played in Cuba the first round of the qualification where they faced the hosts, Aruba and Bahamas but failing to advance to the next round. 

In 2014 they went to Bahamas this time managed by Vítor Hugo Barros where they earned a win against Bahamas but failed to advance after losing 2-0 against Martinique and drawing scoreless to Bermudas.

Steven Estrada managed the team in 2016 with a very limited time to prepare. They lost all the matches against Haiti, Cayman Islands and Aruba, scoring only one goal.

Marco Vélez took charge of the U-17 in 2019. After a successful first round, the team reached the Round of 16 of the Concacaf Championship where they lost 2-1 against Mexico. 

The team returned in 2022 with Pablo Almagro a head coach. Puerto Rico advanced as group leaders through the qualifying round with 25 goals scored and none conceded. They managed to get a historic result defeating Costa Rica in the Round of 16 of the 2023 Concacaf U-17 Championship.

Fixtures and recent results

The following is a list of match results from the previous 12 months, as well as any future matches that have been scheduled.

2022

2023

Players

Current squad
The following players were selected for the 2023 CONCACAF U-17 Championship.

Competitive record

CONCACAF U-17 Championship

References

External links

Caribbean national under-17 association football teams
Football